Polish Resistance may refer to:

1569–1795

Repnin Sejm
Bar Confederation
Great Sejm
Kościuszko Uprising
Greater Poland Uprising (1794)

1795–1918

Greater Poland Uprising (1806)
November Uprising
Greater Poland Uprising (1846)
Kraków Uprising
Greater Poland Uprising (1848)
January Uprising
Organic work
Revolution in the Kingdom of Poland (1905–07)
Łódź insurrection (1905)
Greater Poland Uprising (1918–19)

1918–39

Sejny Uprising
Silesian Uprisings

1939–45

Polish Underground State
Armia Krajowa (the Home Army), Polish underground army in World War II (400 000 sworn members)
Narodowe Siły Zbrojne (National Armed Forces)
Bataliony Chłopskie
Gwardia Ludowa (the People's Guard) and Armia Ludowa (the People's Army)
Związek Organizacji Wojskowej, at Auschwitz concentration camp
Żydowska Organizacja Bojowa (ZOB, the Jewish Fighting Organisation), Jewish resistance movement that led the Warsaw Ghetto Uprising in 1943
Żydowski Związek Walki (ZZW, the Jewish Fighting Union), Jewish resistance movement that led the Warsaw Ghetto Uprising in 1943

1945–89

Cursed soldiers
Anti-communist resistance in Poland (disambiguation)
Poznań 1956 protests
Polish 1970 protests
Solidarity (Polish trade union)